Isaac McCormick House, also known as McCormick Farm, is a historic home located near Defiance, St. Charles County, Missouri. It was built about 1867, and is a two-story, "L"-plan, log dwelling. It consists of a single pen hewn log main section with single pen hewn log ell. The main section measures approximately 18 feet wide and 27 feet deep and has a side gable roof.

It was added to the National Register of Historic Places in 2004.

References

Log houses
Houses on the National Register of Historic Places in Missouri
Houses completed in 1867
Buildings and structures in St. Charles County, Missouri
National Register of Historic Places in St. Charles County, Missouri